Hoàng Thị Bảo Trâm (born 9 January 1987) is a Vietnamese chess player and Woman Grandmaster. She is a two-time Vietnamese Women's Chess Championship winner (2011, 2018), Women's Asian Team Chess Championship team gold winner (2005), and two-time World Women's Team Chess Championships individual medalist (2011, 2017).

Biography
Hoàng Thị Bảo Trâm won Vietnamese Women's Chess Championship in 2011 and in 2018.

Hoàng Thị Bảo Trâm played for Vietnam in the Women's Chess Olympiads:
 In 2006, at second board in the 37th Chess Olympiad (women) in Turin (+5, =4, -2),
 In 2008, at fourth board in the 38th Chess Olympiad (women) in Dresden (+4, =0, -4),
 In 2010, at first board in the 39th Chess Olympiad (women) in Khanty-Mansiysk (+3, =2, -4),
 In 2014, at third board in the 41st Chess Olympiad (women) in Tromsø (+4, =2, -3),
 In 2016, at second board in the 42nd Chess Olympiad (women) in Baku (+4, =3, -4),
 In 2018, at third board in the 43rd Chess Olympiad (women) in Batumi (+3, =2, -2).

Hoàng Thị Bảo Trâm played for Vietnam in the World Women's Team Chess Championships:
 In 2007, at third board in the 1st Women's World Team Chess Championship in Yekaterinburg (+1, =3, -3),
 In 2009, at first board in the 2nd Women's World Team Chess Championship in Ningbo (+1, =5, -3),
 In 2011, at second board in the 3rd Women's World Team Chess Championship in Mardin (+4, =2, -2) and won individual bronze medal,
 In 2017, at second board in the 5th Women's World Team Chess Championship in Khanty-Mansiysk (+3, =4, -0) and won individual gold medal.

Hoàng Thị Bảo Trâm played for Vietnam in the Women's Asian Team Chess Championships:
 In 2005, at first reserve board in the 4th Asian Team Chess Championship (women) in Isfahan (+3, =2, -0) and won team and individual gold medals,
 In 2008, at first reserve board in the 5th Asian Team Chess Championship (women) in Visakhapatnam (+2, =2, -0) and won team bronze and individual silver medals,
 In 2014, at second board in the 8th Asian Women's Nations Chess Cup in Tabriz (+2, =2, -1) and won individual bronze medal,
 In 2016, at second board in the 9th Asian Women's Nations Chess Cup in Abu Dhabi (+4, =1, -2) and won individual bronze medal.

Hoàng Thị Bảo Trâm played for Vietnam in the Asian Games:
 In 2010, at first board in the 16th Asian Games (chess - women) in Guangzhou (+0, =4, -4) and won team bronze medal.

Hoàng Thị Bảo Trâm played for Vietnam in the Asian Indoor Games:
 In 2009, at first women board in the 3rd Asian Indoor Chess Games in Hanoi (+4, =4, -2) and won team silver medal.

In 2005, she was awarded the FIDE Woman International Master (WIM) title and received the FIDE Woman Grandmaster (WGM) title a year later.

References

External links
 
 
 

1987 births
Living people
Vietnamese chess players
Chess woman grandmasters
Chess Olympiad competitors
Asian Games medalists in chess
Asian Games bronze medalists for Vietnam
Chess players at the 2010 Asian Games
Medalists at the 2010 Asian Games
Southeast Asian Games medalists in chess
Southeast Asian Games silver medalists for Vietnam
Competitors at the 2011 Southeast Asian Games
Competitors at the 2021 Southeast Asian Games